was a Japanese actress, voice actress and narrator. During her life, she was attached to the Himawari Theatre Group as a child and then to Aoni Production at the time of her death. She was most known for voicing the character of Bulma (Dragon Ball) for over 31 years. She was also known for her roles as Ukyo Kuonji (Ranma ½), Dokin-chan (Soreike! Anpanman), Madoka Ayukawa (Kimagure Orange Road), Miyuki Kashima (Miyuki), Reiko Mikami (Ghost Sweeper Mikami), Meryl Strife (Trigun), Naomi Hunter (Metal Gear series), Oyone-baasan (Chibi Maruko-chan), and Asuna Kujo (Maison Ikkoku).

Biography
Tsuru was born in Chitose, Hokkaido. In the second grade of elementary school, she joined the Himawari Theatre Group with her sister. In 1968, Tsuru auditioned for Princess Comet (TBS) and made her drama debut in episode 63 "Yokai no Mori". In 1969, she also appeared in the fourth episode "Masked Cemetery" of Horror Theater Unbalance (Fuji TV) under the direction of Eizo Yamagiwa and with the same script by Shinichi Ichikawa.

After that, she appeared on the cover of learning magazines, fashion shows for children's clothing, and television dramas such as Aya no Onna (Fuji TV). Tsuru also lent her voice to Jodie Foster in the American film Bugsy Malone aired on Sunday Western Painting Theater (TV Asahi).

Career
After debuting as an actress, Tsuru graduated from Tsurumi High School in Kanagawa Prefecture. In 1978, when she was a junior in high school, she auditioned for the World Masterpiece Theater series The Story of Perrine and made her voice acting debut in the role of the main character, Perrine Paindavoine. After the airing of The Story of Perrine, she hadn't been a voice actor for two years, but in 1981 she was in charge of the cat role in Ohayō! Spank.

In 1982, after auditioning for the role of Revi in Arcadia of My Youth: Endless Orbit SSX, she transferred from the Sunaoka office to Aoni Production in order to work on her voice in earnest. Since then, Tsuru was active as a voice actress.

Since the 1990s, the business of storytelling on variety shows and newscasts has grown, and her activities focused on it. She also appeared on stage. Tsuru worked as a storyteller until shortly before her death.

Personal life
She was married to Keiichi Nanba from 1986 until they divorced in 1990. They had no children.

Death
Tsuru was found unconscious in her car on the Inner Circular Route near Nihonbashi in Tokyo, was transported to a hospital, and was pronounced dead. Her agency later confirmed that she died on November 16 at the age of 57 from aortic dissection.

Successors
Aya Hisakawa for Dragon Ball (Bulma)
Miina Tominaga for Anpanman (Dokin-chan)
Atsuko Tanaka for Yakuza Kiwami (Reina)
Masumi Asano for One Piece (Shakuyaku)

Filmography

Television animation
1970s
The Story of Perrine (1978) (Perrine Paindavoine [debut])

1980s
Ohayō! Spank (1981) (Cat)
Space Cobra (1982) (Sierra)
Little Pollon (1982) (Selene, Goddess)
Arcadia of My Youth: Endless Orbit SSX (1982) (Revi)
The Kabocha Wine (1982) (Kanzaki, Yōko)
Warrior of Love Rainbowman (1982) (Yōko Ohmiya)
The Super Dimension Fortress Macross (1982) (Kim Kabirov)
Kinnikuman (1983) (Natsuko Shōno, Girl A, Terryman (young) (Episode 11))
Lightspeed Electroid Albegas (1983) (Hotaru Mizuki)
Miyuki (1983) (Miyuki Kashima)
Stop!! Hibari-kun! (1983) (Rie Kawai)
Nine (1984) (Yoko Takagi)
Galactic Patrol Lensman (1984) (Zelda)
Star Musketeer Bismark (1984) (Chyntia)
Touch (1985) (Sachiko Nishio)
Cat's Eye (1985) (Cathy, Akiko)
Bosco Adventure (1986) (Unicorn)
Dragon Ball (1986) (Bulma and Child Piccolo Jr.)
Hikari no Densetsu (1986) (Miyako Kamijou)
Maison Ikkoku (1986) (Asuna Kujou)
Saint Seiya (1986) (Chameleon June, Mermaid Thetis)
Esper Mami (1987) (Taeko Kuroyuki)
Hiatari Ryōkō! (1987) (Keiko Seki)
Tsuide ni Tonchinkan (1987) (Naoko Ibaraki)
Kimagure Orange Road (1987) (Madoka Ayukawa)
Anpanman (1988) (Dokin-chan)
City Hunter 2 (1988) (Katharine)
Dragon Ball Z (1989) (Bulma, Baby Trunks, Bra and West Kaiō-shin)
Ranma ½ Nettōhen (1989) (Ukyo Kuonji and Kaori Daikoku)

1990s
Tsuyoshi Shikkari Shinasai (1992) (Keiko Igawa)
Ghost Sweeper Mikami (1993) (Reiko Mikami)
Dragon Ball GT (1996) (Bulma, Bra, Bulma's Descendant)
Cyber Team in Akihabara (1998) (Hinako Hanakoganei, Petit Angel)
Silent Möbius (1998) (Kiddy Phenil)
Trigun (1998) (Meryl Stryfe)
Kamikaze Kaito Jeanne (1999) (Joan of Arc)
Monster Rancher (1999) (Undine)

2000s
Gravitation (2000) (Mika Seguchi)
Love Hina (2000) (Mrs. Maehara)
Detective Conan (2000) (Kuniko Yamamoto)
Samurai Girl: Real Bout High School (2001) (Madoka Mitsurugi)
Great Dangaioh (2001) (Mrs. Midorikawa)
Vampiyan Kids (2001) (Mama)
Dragon Drive (2002) (Hideaki)
Samurai Champloo (2004) (Shino/Kohaku)
Yu-Gi-Oh! GX (2007) (Yubel's female voice)
Porphy no Nagai Tabi (2008) (Isabella)
One Piece (2009) (Shakuyaku)
Dragon Ball Kai (2009) (Bulma, Baby Trunks, Bra and West Kaiō-shin)

2010s
Blue Exorcist (2011) (Michelle)
Chibi Maruko-chan (2011) (Oyone (Second))
Saint Seiya Omega (2013) (Pallas)
Dragon Ball Super (2015) (Bulma, Tights, Bra)

Original video animation (OVA)
Leda: The Fantastic Adventure of Yohko (1985) (Yohko Asagiri)
Gall Force (Movies and OVA's 1986-1997) (Lufy)
Prefectural Earth Defense Force (1986) (Baradaki)
Wounded Man (1986-1988) (Natsuko Komiya)
Hana no Asuka-gumi! (1987-1990) (Asuka Kuraku)
Demon City Shinjuku (1988) (Sayaka)
Dominion (1988-1989) (Leona Ozaki)
One Pound Gospel (1988) (Sister Angela)
Blood Reign: Curse of the Yoma (1989) (Aya 1)
Blue Sonnet (1989-1990) (Sonnet Barje)
Kimagure Orange Road (1989-1991) (Madoka Ayukawa)
Cleopatra DC (1989) (Suen)
Devil Hunter Yohko (1990-1995) (Sayoko Mano)
Here is Greenwood (1990-1993) (Nagisa Tezuka)
Ranma ½ series (1993-2008) (Ukyo Kuonji)
Shonan Junai Gumi (1994) (Ayumi Murakoshi)
Golden Boy (1995) (Software Company President)
Gravitation (1999) (Mika Seguchi)

Movies
Arcadia of My Youth (1982) (Mira)
Penguin`s Memory: Shiawase Monogatari (1985) (Jill)
Dragon Ball: Curse of the Blood Rubies (1986) (Bulma)
Dragon Ball: Sleeping Princess in Devil's Castle (1987) (Bulma)
Kimagure Orange Road (1988) (Madoka Ayukawa)
Hiatari Ryōkō! Ka - su - mi: Yume no Naka ni Kimi ga Ita (1988) (Keiko Seki)
Dragon Ball: Mystical Adventure (1988) (Bulma)
Ultraman: The Adventure Begins (1989) (Beth O'Brien/Ultrawoman Beth)
Dragon Ball Z: Dead Zone (1989) (Bulma)
Dragon Ball Z: The World's Strongest (1990) (Bulma)
Dragon Ball Z: The Tree of Might (1990) (Bulma)
Dragon Ball Z: Lord Slug (1991) (Bulma)
Dragon Ball Z: Broly – The Legendary Super Saiyan (1993) (Bulma, Baby Trunks)
Dragon Ball Z: Bojack Unbound (1993) (Bulma, Baby Trunks)
Street Fighter II: The Animated Movie (1994) (Eliza Masters)
Ghost Sweeper Mikami: Gokuraku Daisakusen (1994) (Reiko Mikami)
Dragon Ball Z: Fusion Reborn (1995) (Bulma)
Dragon Ball Z: Wrath of the Dragon (1995) (Bulma)
Dragon Ball: The Path to Power (1996) (Bulma)
Trigun: Badlands Rumble (2010) (Meryl Stryfe)
Dragon Ball Z: Battle of Gods (2013) (Bulma)
Dragon Ball Z: Resurrection 'F' (2015) (Bulma)

Games
Cobra series (1991-2014)  (Utopia Moore)
Cosmic Fantasy 2 (1991) (Rim Norlandia)
Graduation series (1992-2006) (Kiyomi Arai)
Ghost Sweeper Mikami: Joreishi wa Nice Body (1993) (Reiko Mikami)
Ghost Sweeper Mikami (1994) (Reiko Mikami)
Dear Langrisser II (1995) (General Imelda)
Dragon Ball series (1994-2018) (Bulma)
Dragoon Might (1995) (Tsugumi, Layla)
Tekken 3 (1997) (Julia Chang)
Ghost in the Shell (1997) (Motoko Kusanagi)
Metal Gear Solid (1998) (Dr. Naomi Hunter)
Tekken Tag Tournament (1999) (Julia Chang)
Little Princess: Marl Ōkoku no Ningyō Hime 2 (1999) (Akujo)
Dororo (2004) (Misaki)
Shining Force EXA (2007) (Zhirra)
The Legend of Heroes: Trails in the Sky the 3rd (2007) (Rufina Argent)
Dragon Ball: Origins (2008) (Bulma)
Metal Gear Solid 4: Guns of the Patriots (2008) (Dr. Naomi Hunter)
Super Robot Wars Z 2008 (Supreme Commander Teral)
Yakuza 0 (2015) (Reina)
Bravely Second: End Layer (2015) (Anne)
Drift Girls (2015) (Izumisawa Mai)
Devil's Third (2015) (Jane Doe)

Tokusatsu
Kamen Rider Agito Movie (2001) (Queen Ant Lord/Formica Regia)
Engine Sentai Go-onger (2008) (Savage Water Barbaric Machine Beast Shower Banki (ep. 38))
Kamen Rider OOO (2011) (Pteranodon Yammy <♀> (ep. 32) )

Drama CDs
The Origin of Mewtwo (1998 (Radio broadcast), 1999 (CD release)) (Madame Boss)

Dubbing

Live-action
Megan Follows
Anne of Green Gables (Anne Shirley)
Anne of Avonlea (Anne Shirley)
Anne of Green Gables: The Continuing Story (Anne Shirley Blythe)
City Hunter (Saeko Nogami (Chingmy Yau))
Footloose (Fuji TV edition) (Rusty (Sarah Jessica Parker))
The Freshman (Tina Sabatini (Penelope Ann Miller))
Full House (Carrie (Erika Eleniak))
Heart of Dragon (1987 TBS edition) (Jenny (Emily Chu))
Little House on the Prairie (Etta Plum (Leslie Landon))
Some Kind of Wonderful (Watts (Mary Stuart Masterson))

Animation
The Animatrix (Trinity)

References

External links
 

1960 births
2017 deaths
Aoni Production voice actors
Deaths from aortic dissection
Japanese child actresses
Japanese stage actresses
Japanese video game actresses
Japanese voice actresses
Voice actresses from Hokkaido
20th-century Japanese actresses
21st-century Japanese actresses